Santolina impressa is a species of flowering plant in the family Asteraceae, endemic to southwest Portugal specifically the area between Setúbal and Sines. It inhabits psammophilous scrub in stabilized dunes (often paleodunes), sometimes under pine forests. On acidic sandy soils, becoming particularly abundant in somewhat disturbed places.

References

Anthemideae
Endemic flora of Portugal
Endemic flora of the Iberian Peninsula